Sediles is a municipality located in the Comunidad de Calatayud, province of Zaragoza, Aragon, Spain. According to the 2004 census (INE), the municipality has a population of 93 inhabitants.

The town is located at the feet of the Sierra de Vicort range.

References

Municipalities in the Province of Zaragoza